This is a list of the Spanish PROMUSICAE Top 20 Singles number-ones of 1993.

Chart history

See also
1993 in music
List of number-one hits (Spain)

References

1993
Spain Singles
Number-one singles